Rowdy (officially Rowdy the Roadrunner) is the mascot of the University of Texas at San Antonio Roadrunners. He appears at athletic events, such as football and basketball games, and other university sponsored events. An anthropomorphic roadrunner, Rowdy is based upon the Greater Roadrunner.

History
The origin of Rowdy dates back to 1977, when the Student Representative Assembly (the forerunner to the modern Student Government Association) was openly debating the university's mascot. An original vote, which favored "The Armadillos" and "The Stars" was declared null and void by the SRA, making way for a second campus-wide poll. The second election was hotly contested between "The Roadrunners" and "The Armadillos"—with vigorous support on either side. after the final vote, the roadrunner was announced as the official mascot of UTSA at a bonfire celebration later that year. 

On March 1, 2008, UTSA unveiled the new Rowdy and UTSA logos at the homecoming men's basketball game vs. Texas A&M University–Corpus Christi. Many students and administrators at UTSA thought the previous Rowdy bore too much resemblance to the Kansas Jayhawk.

References

Conference USA mascots
UTSA Roadrunners
Fictional birds